Watching and waiting can mean: 

 Watchful waiting, in medicine
 "Watching and Waiting", a 1969 single by the Moody Blues